Chiko is a German 2008 film written and directed by Özgür Yıldırım.

Cast
Denis Moschitto as Chiko
Moritz Bleibtreu as Brownie
Volkan Özcan as Tibet
Fahri Ogün Yardım as Curly
Reyhan Şahin as Meryem
Lilay Huser as Tibets Mutter
Philipp Baltus as Scholle
Henny Reents as Reji
Hans Löw as Sascha
Simon Goerts as Jimmi

Production
Filming took place in Hamburg and Hannover.

External links
 

2008 films
2000s German-language films
2000s Turkish-language films
2008 crime drama films
Films about drugs
Films set in Hamburg
Vertigo Films films
German crime drama films
Films shot in Hamburg
2008 multilingual films
German multilingual films
2000s German films